Spooner may refer to:

Places 
 Spooner, Wisconsin, a city 
 Spooner (town), Wisconsin
 Spooner Bay, Enderby Land, Antarctica
 Spooner Lake, a reservoir on North Canyon Creek in Nevada
 Spooner Row, a village in Norfolk, England
 Spooner Summit, a mountain pass through the Sierra Nevada's Carson Range spur
 Spooner Township, Lake of the Woods County, Minnesota

Entertainment 
 Spooner (band), an American midwestern rock band
 Spooner (2009 film), a 2009 US movie directed by Drake Doremus
 Spooner (1989 film), a 1989 US made-for-TV movie starring Robert Urich

Other 
 One of the names of the spoon tray

People and fictional characters 
 Spooner (surname), including list of name-holders
 Spooner Oldham (born 1943), American songwriter and musician

See also 
 Spooner Act of 1902, authored by John Coit Spooner and authorizing President Theodore Roosevelt to purchase rights to build the Panama Canal
 Spon (disambiguation)